Li Ying is a fictional character in Water Margin, one of the four great classical novels in Chinese literature. Nicknamed "Striking Hawk", he ranks 11th among the 36 Heavenly Spirits, the first third of the 108 Stars of Destiny.

Background
The novel depicts Li Ying as unique-looking with eyes like those of a hawk, a head like that of a tiger, arms like those of an ape and a waist like that of a wolf. In battles he dons a red robe, rides a white stallion and wields a steel spear. He is known for his deadly accuracy in throwing daggers, for which he is nicknamed "Striking Hawk".

Li Ying is the master of the Li Family Manor, which stands with the Zhu and Hu Family Manors on the Lone Dragon Ridge located in Yunzhou (Zhongshan Prefecture  in present-day Dongping County, Shandong province). Wealthy and in command of a militia force, Li Ying is generous and likes to make friends with chivalrous men.

Battle of the Zhu Family Village
Shi Qian is seized by the Zhu Family Manor after he stole the only rooster of an inn under the Zhus and cooked it for meal. His companions Yang Xiong and Shi Xiu, who are travelling with him to join the Liangshan outlaws, stumble into the neighbouring Li Family Manor  pursued by men of the Zhu family. They run into Li Ying's steward Du Xing, who has once received help from Yang Xiong in Jizhou when Yang was a chief warden. Du brings them to his master Li Ying, who thinks the incident could be easily resolved. He writes a letter to the Zhus, politely asking them to release Shi Qian. His request rejected, Li writes a second letter and sends Du Xing to deliver it to show he is earnest about the matter. This time the Zhus malign him, alleging that he is linked to Liangshan. Infuriated, Li leads some men to the Zhu Manor to avenge the insult. Zhu Biao hits Li Ying with an arrow, causing him to fall off his horse. Yang Xiong and Shi Xiu rush forth to pull him to safety.

Joining Liangshan
Yang Xiong and Shi Xiu reach Liangshan Marsh, their only hope to save Shi Qian. Chao Gai, the chief of Liangshan, sends Song Jiang to lead a military attack on the Zhu Family Manor. It is a tough fight that takes the outlaws three offensives to finally overrun the place. Li Ying did not participate in the battles because he wanted no association with the outlaws. Besides he was nursing his injured arm.

Song Jiang, however, wants to recruit Li Ying into his band. After finishing off the Zhus, he sends men to the Li Family Manor disguised as constables to "arrest" Li Ying and Du Xing for collaboration with outlaws. As the two are being "escorted" to the prefecture office, some Liangshan outlaws "rescue" them. When Li Ying realises he has been duped, he has no choice but to join the stronghold.

Campaigns and later life
Li Ying is placed in charge of Liangshan's accounts with Chai Jin after the 108 Stars of Destiny came together in what is called the "Grand Assembly". He participates in the campaigns against the Liao invaders and rebel forces in Song territory following amnesty from Emperor Huizong for Liangshan. 

Li Ying is one of the few Liangshan heroes who survive the campaigns. He is appointed an official in recognition of his contributions. Six months into his job, Li Ying learns that Chai Jin has resigned and returned home. He too feigns illness and quits his post. He and Du Xing go back to their manor at Lone Dragon Ridge and live in comfort for the rest of their lives.

References
 
 
 
 
 
 
 

36 Heavenly Spirits
Fictional characters from Shandong